Bavorov is a town in Strakonice District in the South Bohemian Region of the Czech Republic. It has about 1,600 inhabitants. The historic town centre is well preserved and is protected by law as an urban monument zone.

Administrative parts

Villages of Blanice, Čichtice, Svinětice, Tourov and Útěšov are administrative parts of Bavorov.

Geography
It lies in the Bohemian Forest Foothills. The river Blanice flows through the municipality. There are several ponds in the municipality, the largest are Rozboud, Bašta and Hluboký.

History
The first written mention of Bavorov is from 1228. The town was named after its founders, noble family of Bavors of Strakonice. The most important for the town was John Bavor III, who settled in Bavorov in 1315 and who had the square and surrounding streets built.

In 1351, the Rosenberg family acquired Bavorov. Bavorov was the seat of the estate until 1355, when the Helfenburk Castle was built. The Rosenberg family owned the town until 1593, when Peter Vok of Rosenberg sold all the Helfenburk estate to Prachatice. After the Battle of White Mountain, properties of Prachatice were confiscated, and in 1621 the royal chamber donated Bavorov to the Eggenberg family. In 1719, the House of Schwarzenberg inherited the town.

Demographics

Economy
The town is mainly known for its strawberry production, which began here in 1991.

Transport
The regional railway Volary–Číčenice goes through the municipality. There are two rail stations: Bavorov and Svinětice. The third station which serves the territory, Blanice, lies beyond the borders of the municipality.

Sights

The most valuable building in Bavorov is the Church of the Assumption of the Virgin Mary. It is one of the most important South Bohemian Gothic buildings. The church replaced an older church, which stood here from 1296, and was built from 1360 to 1384.

The historic centre of Bavorov is Míru Square, which is in the shape of a regular square typical for South Bohemian Region. The former manor house, locally called "The Castle", is a Baroque building that dominates the square. In the centre of the square there is a fountain built in 1742.

Small Worlds is a museum of dollshouses, models and other tiny toys. It is open during the summer months and for special events.

The most valuable technical monument is a water mill with unique hydroelectric power plant. The mill was built in the first half of the 19th century and the power plant in the 1930s.

Notable people
Jindřich Veselý (1885–1939), historian of puppetry and founder of UNIMA

Gallery

References

External links

 

Cities and towns in the Czech Republic
Populated places in Strakonice District
Prácheňsko